Phillip Elias Areeda (January 28, 1930 – December 24, 1995) was an American legal scholar known for his scholarship on U.S. antitrust law. Areeda was a law professor at Harvard University from 1961 until his death in 1995.

Life and career
Areeda was born in Detroit, Michigan, in 1930. He was of Lebanese ancestry. He studied economics at Harvard University, graduating in 1951 with an A.B. summa cum laude. He then attended the Harvard Law School, becoming an editor of the Harvard Law Review and graduating in 1954 with an LL.B. summa cum laude.

After law school, Areeda served in the U.S. Air Force for two years. In 1956, he was appointed Special Assistant in the White House Office, and in 1958 he was appointed Assistant Special Counsel to the President. As Assistant Special Counsel, he helped draft and research White House staff studies dealing with economic and legal matters. Areeda continued in these duties until the end of the Eisenhower Administration. In 1961 he accepted a position on the Harvard Law School faculty, and published a book, Antitrust Analysis, in 1967. In the autumn of 1974 and winter of 1975, he briefly served as a White House Counsel in the Ford Administration.

Areeda was elected a Fellow of the American Academy of Arts and Sciences in 1983. He died of leukemia in 1995 in Cambridge, Massachusetts aged 65. A building at Harvard Law, Areeda Hall, is named in his honor.

References

External links
Papers and Records of Phillip E. Areeda, Dwight D. Eisenhower Presidential Library
Obituary from the New York Times
Posthumous teaching award from Harvard

Harvard Law School alumni
Harvard Law School faculty
1930 births
1995 deaths
Deaths from leukemia
Scholars of competition law
American people of Lebanese descent
Lawyers from Detroit
Fellows of the American Academy of Arts and Sciences
American legal scholars
Deaths from cancer in Massachusetts
20th-century American lawyers
John M. Olin Foundation